Darwinii, a Latin word commonly referring to English naturalist Charles Darwin (1809–1882), may refer to:

Species 
 Amphisbaena darwinii
 Diplolaemus darwinii
 Gymnodactylus darwinii
 Homonota darwinii
 Liolaemus darwinii

Subspecies
 Distephanopsis crux subsp. darwinii
 Distephanus crux subsp. darwinii
 Homonota darwinii darwinii, a subspecies in the gecko species Homonota darwinii and the genus Homonota
 Yucca × Darwinii, a variety in the genus Yucca created by German botanist Carl Ludwig Sprenger (1846–1917)

See also 
 Darwini (disambiguation)

Latin words and phrases